Terese Terranova (born May 21, 1947) is a retired American para table tennis player. She became disabled after being involved in a car accident where she was crushed against a concrete wall by a car and resulted in her back being broken in five separate places.

Born in North Bergen, New Jersey, Terranova was raised in Northvale, New Jersey, where she attended Northern Valley Regional High School at Old Tappan.
Terranova has participated in four Paralympic Games and has won team titles along with Jennifer Johnson in both world, Paralympic and Parapan events. She returned to competition in 2019 to participate in the 2019 Parapan American Games in Lima, Peru where she failed to advance into the later stages of the competition.

References

1947 births
Living people
Northern Valley Regional High School at Old Tappan alumni
People from North Bergen, New Jersey
People from Northvale, New Jersey
Sportspeople from Bergen County, New Jersey
Sportspeople from Fort Lauderdale, Florida
Paralympic table tennis players of the United States
Table tennis players at the 1988 Summer Paralympics
Table tennis players at the 1992 Summer Paralympics
Table tennis players at the 1996 Summer Paralympics
Table tennis players at the 2000 Summer Paralympics
American female table tennis players
20th-century American women